Psilodorha is a subgenus of the genus Drosophila.

References 

 Psilodorha
Insect subgenera